Ulrich von Türheim (c. 1195 – c. 1250) was a German writer from the Augsburg area writing during the first half of the 13th century. Three of his works have survived: a conclusion to the version of the Tristan legend left unfinished by Gottfried von Strassburg; Rennewart, a continuation of Willehalm, left unfinished by Wolfram von Eschenbach; and fragments of a version of Cligès based on that of Chrétien de Troyes. It is not known whether this last work was a separate work or also a continuation, in this case of a now lost Cligès by Konrad Fleck. The relative chronology of these works is disputed, though Rennewart is generally regarded as the last.

Conrad of Winterstetten was his patron.

Editions
Ulrich von Türheim, Tristan, edited by Thomas Kerth (Altdeutsche Textbibliothek 89), Tübingen 1979.
Ulrich von Türheim, Rennewart, edited by Alfred Hübner (Deutsche Texte des Mittelalters 3), Berlin 1938, ²1964.
A. Bachmann, "Bruchstücke eines mittelhochdeutschen Cligès", Zeitschrift für deutsches Altertum 32 (1888) 123ff.
A. Vizkelety, "Neue Fragmente des mittelhochdeutschen Cligès", Zeitschrift für deutsche Philologie 88 (1969) 409ff.

Further reading
Die deutsche Literatur des Mittelalters : Verfasserlexikon, Second Edition edited by Kurt Ruh, Berlin 1977-, volume 10.

External links
 

13th-century German poets
13th-century deaths
Writers of Arthurian literature
Middle High German literature
Writers from Augsburg
Year of birth unknown
Year of birth uncertain
German male poets